Nikos Alefantos (3 January 1939 – 23 June 2020) was a Greek professional footballer and football coach. He is regarded as one of the most innovative managers of the 20th century, known in Greece for his phlegmatic personality, short temper, famous quips, various moments and experiences from his days in the football pitches and is regarded as the greatest Greek manager never to have won one of the two major titles (Alpha Ethniki/Greek Superleague and Greek Football Cup) in his home country. In his 35-year managerial career he managed 28 different teams, most notably his three spells at Olympiacos (1983-84, 1993-94, 2003-04) and at Iraklis, where he led a team with 1 point in 6 matches to a 4th place in 1985-86, after what was dubbed the "Play-off of Shame" in Greece.

Career
Alefantos managed several clubs in the Greek Super League, including Olympiacos during 2004. He also had brief spells leading AEL in 1975 and 1990.

Alefantos gained notoriety for his unusually short tenure as the manager of Fostiras in 2002. He was appointed manager of the club, replacing Vlachos in September 2002. One of Fostira's players, Dimitrios Moutas, immediately refused to train with Alefantos, and then Alefantos resigned later that day after failed contract negotiations. Eventually Alefantos appeared in ART channel of Greece, participating in a sport TV program called "Dokari Kai mesa" presented by Giannis Karatzaferis.

He died from a heart attack on 23 June 2020, aged 81.

Managerial statistics

NOTE: Matches during Alefantos' second tenure at Pierikos are counted by pitch performances and not by the court ruling which relegated Pierikos in the 1978-79 season.

Olympiacos managerial Statistics

Honours
APOEL
 Cypriot Cup: 1996–97
PAS Giannina
 Promotion title: 1973-74
Pierikos
 Promotion title: 1974-75
Ionikos
 Promotion: 1991-92

References

External links
Alefantos Biography

2020 deaths
AEK Athens F.C. managers
Greek football managers
PAS Giannina F.C. managers
Iraklis Thessaloniki F.C. managers
Olympiacos F.C. players
Olympiacos F.C. managers
Pierikos F.C. managers
PAOK FC managers
Vyzas F.C. players
Greek expatriate football managers
Greek expatriates in Cyprus
Expatriate football managers in Cyprus
OFI Crete F.C. managers
Panionios F.C. managers
Ionikos F.C. managers
APOEL FC managers
Panachaiki F.C. managers
Xanthi F.C. managers
Proodeftiki F.C. managers
Super League Greece managers
Footballers from Athens
Greek footballers
1939 births
Panegialios F.C. players
Association football midfielders
Panelefsiniakos F.C. players
Anorthosis Famagusta F.C. managers
Rouf F.C. managers